Pembine High School is a high school in the Town of Pembine, Wisconsin. The school is officially named Beecher-Dunbar-Pembine High School after the district to which it belongs. Opened in 1903, the high school originally served the Pembine District, but later added other geographic areas. The school serves K-12 students, with a student population of 257.

History
The first high school in  Pembine was a four-room schoolhouse built in 1903 that served different grades. In 1957 additions of a cafeteria, gym, and shop enlarged and modernized the school. Further additions came in 1973 with four larger classrooms and a library. In 1990, when the school faced overcrowding problems, it considered consolidating with Niagara High School. The decision to consolidate was turned down by a town vote. In 1997 to answer the overcrowding problem the town passed a $2 million addition to Pembine High School that nearly doubled the square footage.

Academics
Pembine High School requires at least 25 credits in core courses to graduate. Departments include:

Art
Career and Technical Education
English
Math
Music
Science
Social Studies

On December 23, 2013, seven teachers at Pembine High School were among 77 statewide to earn National Board Certification.  This made Pembine the school with the highest concentration of Nationally Board Certified Educators in the state.

Extracurricular activities
Extracurricular activities include:
Art Club
Band 
Handbells 
Math Club
Drama Club
School Yearbook
Student Council
Forensics
French Club
National Honor Society
Students Against Dangerous Decisions (SADD)

Sports
Pembine High School has three mascots for its athletic teams.  For football, Pembine tri-ops with Niagara Public School and Goodman-Armstrong Creek High School to make up the Northern Elite Predators. Girls' high school basketball, girls' high school softball, boys' high school baseball, girls' cross country and boys' cross country are consolidated with Goodman-Armstrong Creek High School to make up the Pembine-Goodman Patriots. The mascot of Pembine High School for girls' high school volleyball, boys' high school basketball, and golf is the Panther.

Sports offered (List may be incomplete) 
Boys' basketball 
Girls' basketball 
Football 
Girls' softball
Boys' baseball
Boys' & girls' golf
Girls' volleyball
Cross country

References

External links
Official website

Educational institutions established in 1903
Schools in Marinette County, Wisconsin
Public high schools in Wisconsin
Public middle schools in Wisconsin
Public elementary schools in Wisconsin
1903 establishments in Wisconsin